William Henry Hales (6 January 1920 – 1 October 1984) was an English footballer active in the 1950s. He made 15 appearances in The Football League for Gillingham.

References

1920 births
English Football League players
Gillingham F.C. players
1984 deaths
English footballers
Association football forwards